Geoffrey Edwin Dunn (born 26 February 1961 in Clapham, London, England) is an English rock drummer. From 2002 until 2007, he was the drummer with the rock band Manfred Mann's Earth Band. Before joining the Earth Band, his long list of credits includes a stint playing and recording with Van Morrison, featuring on the albums Too Long in Exile, A Night in San Francisco, Days Like This and The Healing Game.

He was a member of Procol Harum from 2006 until they disbanded in 2022. He appears on their recent live albums One Eye to the Future – Live in Italy 2007, The Spirit of Nøkken and MMX.

References

External links

Geoff Dunn at procolharum.com

1961 births
Living people
English rock drummers
Manfred Mann's Earth Band members
People from Clapham
Procol Harum members